Kastrati may refer to:
Kastrati (tribe)
Kastrati (surname)

See also 
 Kastrat (disambiguation)